SMS Adler was a gunboat of the Imperial German Navy. She was launched 3 November 1883 in the Imperial shipyard in Kiel. On 5 September 1888, she shelled Manono Island and Apolima, Samoa, which were strongholds of Malietoa’s forces. She was wrecked together with the German gunboat , the German corvette , the United States Navy gunboat , the U.S. Navy screw steamer , and the U.S. Navy sloop-of-war  on 16 March 1889 in a hurricane at Apia, Samoa, during the Samoan crisis. Twenty crew members lost their lives.

Propulsion 
4-cylinder double-expansion steam engine
Coal-fired boilers
Speed:

Armament 
5 ×  built-up guns
5 ×  revolver guns

References

Bibliography
 Erich Gröner, Panzerschiffe, Linienschiffe, Schlachtschiffe, Flugzeugträger, Kreuzer, Kanonenboote = Die deutschen Kriegsschiffe, 1815-1945 Vol.I, Bernard & Graefe, 1982, pp. 166–167

Further reading

See also
 1889 Apia cyclone

Gunboats of the Imperial German Navy
Shipwrecks of Samoa
History of Samoa
Maritime incidents in March 1889
1883 ships
Ships built in Kiel
Gunboats of Germany